Blakenhall is a suburb and ward in Wolverhampton, England.

Toponymy and history
Blakenhall's name, according to toponymists comes from the Old English 'blæc', meaning 'black' or dark coloured, & 'halh' meaning 'nook' or 'corner'. It was developed during the late 19th century just south of the town centre, with hundreds of terraced houses, some with shop fronts, being built on the Dudley Road (A459) towards Sedgley, as well as many being built in the side streets running off.

Wanderers Avenue can be found in Blakenhall, the original home of Wolverhampton Wanderers, who regularly played on the adjacent Phoenix Park until 1889. Names of the players can be found on the front of the terraced houses along the street. The club was founded as 'St Luke's Football Club' in 1877, a school side, before merging with another local football and cricket team, 'The Wanderers' two years later to form Wolverhampton Wanderers.

Wolverhampton's very first council houses were built at Blakenhall, on Birmingham Road, in 1902, though it would be nearly 20 years before mass council housing building took place anywhere else in the town. By the 1980s, however, these properties were outdated and they were finally demolished in the spring of 1988.

Vehicle maker AJS moved to a new factory built around Graiseley House on 1914. It closed on their insolvency in 1931 and the site, now occupied by a supermarket (Tesco from July 2021  previously Waitrose and originally Safeway), is marked by a sculpture, The Lone Rider, designed by Steve Field and carved by Robert Bowers, assisted by Michael Scheuermann. The plaque explaining the relevance of the statue attached to the base was stolen several years ago.

In 1919, when work began on the Wolverhampton's first major council housing development to rehouse families from town centre slums, a site around Green Lane (later renamed Birmingham Road and Thompson Avenue) and Parkfield Road was included in this development.

In 1960, 1st Blakenhall Scout Group was formed by Maurice Lane. Maurice was influential in setting up the group which is still going strong today and still recruiting young people aged 6–14.  Although Scouting has changed somewhat since the days 1st Blakenhall has formed the group now meet at St Johns Methodist Church near to the Fighting Cocks crossroads and is open to both male and females in the Blakenhall area.

The next major development in Blakenhall took place in the 1960s when six tower blocks were constructed. One of the two taller tower blocks, Cobden House, was demolished by a controlled explosion in August 2002. The four smaller tower blocks - Neale House, Villiers House, Cross House and Ranelagh House - were cleared in mechanical demolitions during 2007. The final taller tower block, Phoenix Rise (previously known as Franchise House), was demolished in the spring of 2011.

On 8 July 1996, as nationally reported in the news, a machete attack took place at St Luke's Nursery School in Blakenhall, when 32-year-old local man Horrett Campbell ran riot - stabbing 21-year-old nursery nurse Lisa Potts and six children aged between two and four years. He was arrested at his tower block flat in nearby Villiers House the following evening and committed for trial at Stafford Crown Court later that year. He denied the charge of attempted murder but admitted causing grievous bodily harm with intent, but was convicted on seven counts of the more serious charge on 9 December 1996. Due to paranoid schizophrenia, he was detained indefinitely in a mental hospital on 7 March 1997 when a judge at Teesside Crown Court ruled that Campbell was mentally ill.

Today
The ward serves Wolverhampton City Council and forms part of the Wolverhampton South East constituency. The ward also covers the suburb of Goldthorn Park, immediately to the south, and part of Graiseley. It borders Penn, Graiseley, St Peter's, Ettingshall and Spring Vale wards, as well as (briefly) South Staffordshire and the Metropolitan Borough of Dudley.

Blakenhall's community is of predominantly Indian ethnicity (45.6% of the population) which settled into the area in the two decades following the Second World War. The Sikh Guru Nanak Gurdwara occupies the site of a former Corona drinks factory and has at times been able to claim to be the largest Gurdwara in Europe.

Blakenhall is one of the most deprived districts of Wolverhampton, although it has improved slightly since the 1990s due to its designation as an ABC Regeneration Area. A similar initiative covers the neighbouring All Saints district.

Colton Hills Community School and senior part of The Royal School, Wolverhampton are situated in Blakenhall ward. The junior side of The Royal School, Wolverhampton is in Graiseley ward. South Wolverhampton and Bilston Academy was also located in the area in the former Parkfield High School but the academy relocated all facilities to Bilston in 2012.

The 21st century regeneration of Blakenhall has been centred on the Blakenhall Gardens area, built in the 1960s. The first tower block was demolished in 2002, three more tower blocks followed in 2007, and the final tower block, shops and public house were demolished in 2011. The area has since been redeveloped for new housing and shops.

It has been incorrectly reported that one of Blakenhall's oldest and most striking buildings, the 156-year-old St Luke's Church on Moore Street South is to close down for good due to mounting repair bills and structural problems with the tower and spire.  Whilst the building is not currently in use, no decision has yet been made as to the future of the building.

Public houses
Of Blakenhall's pubs, only a handful remain. 'The Rose and Crown', 'The Old Ash Tree', 'The Kings Arms', 'The British Queen' (now a Desi pub) and 'Billa's Bar' (formerly The Fermentine & Firkin and before that "The Ship") are all on the Dudley Road A459. Tucked away on Pool Street is 'The Yew Tree Inn' (a Desi pub), and on Cartwright Street is 'The Crown'. Previously in the area - in fact, lending its name to the area south of Blakenhall, was the 'Fighting Cocks', and the 'Foresters Arms' on Grove Street is still standing, but is closed. The 'Glassey Inn' has now been demolished, and the new Blakenhall Community and Healthy Living Centre, operated by Wolverhampton City Council, stands in its place. The Fighting Cocks was replaced by an Aldi supermarket but lives on as a bus stop on service 1 (Dudley to Tettenhall via Wolverhampton).

References

External links
Local History: Blakenhall

Wards of Wolverhampton City Council
Areas of Wolverhampton